Hypseochloa cameroonensis is a species of grass in the family Poaceae. It is found only in Cameroon. Its natural habitat is subtropical or tropical dry lowland grassland.

References

cameroonensis
Grasses of Africa
Flora of Cameroon
Flora of Nigeria
Flora of Tanzania
Vulnerable flora of Africa
Taxa named by Charles Edward Hubbard
Taxonomy articles created by Polbot